Lannea coromandelica, also known as the Indian ash tree, is a species of tree in the family Anacardiaceae that grows in South and Southeast Asia, ranging from Sri Lanka to Southern China. It is commonly known as Gurjon tree and is used in plywoods for its excellent termite resistance properties.  It most commonly grows in exposed dry woodland environments, where the tree is smaller (up to 10 meters tall) and more crooked. In more humid environments it is a larger spreading tree that can become 20 meters tall. In Sri Lanka Lannea coromandelica often grows on rock outcrops or inselbergs.

References

coromandelica
Flora of the Indian subcontinent
Flora of Indo-China